Sideridis kitti is a moth belonging to the family Noctuidae. The species was first described by Schawerda in 1914.

It is native to Eurasia.

References

Noctuidae